The 2005–06 Liga Alef season saw Hapoel Bnei Tamra (champions of the North Division) and Sektzia Nes Tziona (champions of the South Division) winning the title and promotion to 2006–07.

At the bottom, Hapoel Beit She'an, Maccabi Shefa-'Amr (from North division), F.C. Kafr Qasim and Beitar Giv'at Ze'ev (from South division) were all automatically relegated to Liga Bet, while 12th placed teams from each division, Maccabi Tamra and Maccabi Sha'arayim entered a promotion/relegation play-offs, at the end of which both clubs were relegated as well.

North Division

South Division

Relegation play-offs

North play-off
The 12th placed club in Liga Alef North, Maccabi Tamra, faced Liga Bet North A and North B runners-up, Beitar Haifa and Ironi Sayid Umm al-Fahm. The teams played each other in a round-robin tournament, with all matches held at a neutral venue, Kiryat Eliezer Stadium.

Beitar Haifa won the play-offs and was promoted to Liga Alef.

South play-off
The 12th placed club in Liga Alef South, Maccabi Sha'arayim, faced Liga Bet South A and Liga Bet South B runners-up, Hapoel Azor and Ironi Ramla. The teams played each other in a round-robin tournament, with all matches held at a neutral venue, Bat Yam Municipal Stadium.

Ironi Ramla won the play-offs and was promoted to Liga Alef.

References
Liga Alef 2005/06, walla.co.il 
Play-off Liga Alef/Liga Bet  One 

Liga Alef seasons
4
Israel